MCJ (or variants) may refer to:

 MCJ (company), a Japanese company
 MCJ and Cool G, a former Canadian hip hop duo
 Men's Central Jail, a Los Angeles Country jail